Gigi Fernández and Natasha Zvereva were the defending champions but lost in the final 6–2, 7–5 against Jana Novotná and Arantxa Sánchez Vicario.

Seeds
Champion seeds are indicated in bold text while text in italics indicates the round in which those seeds were eliminated.

 Gigi Fernández /  Natasha Zvereva (final)
 Jana Novotná /  Arantxa Sánchez Vicario (champions)
 Patty Fendick /  Meredith McGrath (semifinals)
 Larisa Neiland /  Elizabeth Smylie (quarterfinals)

Draw

External links
 1994 Light 'n' Lively Doubles Championships Draw

WTA Doubles Championships
1994 WTA Tour